Dichomeris acratopa is a moth in the family Gelechiidae. It was described by Edward Meyrick in 1926. It is found in Cameroon.

Adults are similar to Dichomeris fracticostella, but have the stigmata simple, dot like and dark grey, with the plical beneath the first discal.

References

Endemic fauna of Cameroon
Moths described in 1926
acratopa